Umbilibalcis is a genus of very small ectoparasitic sea snails, marine gastropod mollusks or micromollusks in   the Eulimidae family.

Species
Species within the genus Umbilibalcisinclude :
 Umbilibalcis crassula Bouchet & Warén, 1986
 Umbilibalcis lata (Dall, 1889)
 Umbilibalcis subumbilicata (Jeffreys, 1884)

References

 Bouchet P. & Warén A. (1986). Revision of the Northeast Atlantic bathyal and abyssal Aclididae, Eulimidae, Epitonidae (Mollusca, Gastropoda). Bollettino Malacologico Suppl. 2: 297-576

Eulimidae